Equality Party can refer to the following political organisations:

Equality Party (Azerbaijan)
Equality Party (Chile)
Equality Party (Quebec)
Social Democratic Party (Faroe Islands)
Socialist Equality Party (various countries)
Women's Equality Party (UK)
Women's Equality Party (New York) 
Australian Equality Party (Marriage)